, also known as Stellvia of the Universe, is an anime series set in space. As a prelude to the series, the Earth of year 2167 AD is shown to be devastated by a powerful electromagnetic shockwave. This is caused by a nearby star, Hydrus Beta, 20 light-years away, going supernova. As a result, 3 billion of the 14 billion people on earth were wiped out. The series itself is set 189 years later, in the year 2356 AD. Civilization has been rebuilt with humanity having united together to face the coming of the second shockwave of the supernova. The second shockwave, unlike the first, is to contain a great deal of matter composed of the remnants of the star itself. Stellvia ran for 26 episodes and was produced by the animation studio Xebec. It was distributed in the United States by Geneon. In September 2007 Geneon halted all distribution of anime DVDs in America, including Stellvia. A sequel was originally announced for 2005, but was canceled after internal difficulties.

Beginning with the May 2003 issue, a manga adaptation by Ryo Akizuki was serialized in Dengeki Daioh and has been published in the US as a two volume graphic novel series by DrMaster. The word Stellvia is composed of two Latin words, stella meaning star(s) and via meaning street or road. Therefore, Stellvia is roughly translated as The Road to the Stars.

The series makes references to things such as Theory of knowledge, CAS, and Extended Essay, which suggests that Stellvia might have been partially inspired by the International Baccalaureate program, or at least, included an Ex-IB student in its development. 

In 2018, Discotek Media announced that they have rescued the series following Geneon's downfall.

The series opening theme is "Asu e no brilliant road" by angela.

Plot
The series takes place in the year 2356 A.D., around 189 years after a worldwide catastrophe had wiped out 10% of Earth's population. To keep track on all space activities, mankind has built numerous colossal space stations called "foundations" all across the Solar System. After passing the Space Academy's entrance exams, Shima Katase embarks to the Earth-based foundation Stellvia to fulfill her dreams of seeing the galaxy and to prevent any more interstellar catastrophes from destroying Earth, once and for all.

Characters
 

 The protagonist of the story is Shima (or "Shīpon (しーぽん)" as she is dubbed by Arisa) who joins the Stellvia foundation's space program so that she could "see the stars while looking forward, rather than having to look up". In the beginning, she fluctuates between complete confidence in her abilities and believing she couldn't do anything. The series depicts her as extremely diligent, although she is also a natural genius.

 As the series progresses, she learns to understand her mistakes and not think that she has to be perfect or else fail. For instance, after a rocky start to her training, during which she was dead last in her class at piloting, she takes the advice of Kouta Otoyama and realizes she was trying to keep track of far too much information on her ship displays. Her piloting improves dramatically as a result. However, she still will lose her confidence often. Once she is like that she will get into a deep depression like a little kid thinking that it is because she does not have talent. Actually, Shima has a rare talent. Shima is offered to be the 5th member of the Big 4, after passing the test. Despite her early setbacks as a pilot, her programming abilities are top notch from the very start, and she eventually combines the two in order to become even more formidable in the cockpit. She is called Shipon because the first time she piloted one of the Biancas she flew around like a ping-pong ball. She and Kouta develop a romantic relationship (they share their first kiss on episode 12). She likes Kouta very much but somehow gets irritated when he can't understand her. During the genesis mission she was piloting Halcyon (also called Lucyon by Arisa and Rinna). Some irregularities were interrupting the Infinity, so Halcyon released its barrier and absorbed the irregularities. She almost died at that risk. It is shown that she loves Kouta very much by almost sacrificing her life by saving him from the irregularities.

 

 Kouta is an enigmatic character. He and Shipon develop a romantic relationship (they share their first kiss in episode 12) but there's still a lot about him that remains unknown. He has an older sister who runs an astronomical observatory in Japan. He often gives advice which is as enigmatic as himself.

He consistently achieves rank C in every class, without exception, regardless of how easy or hard the subject is. And when he was warned of the possibility of Ayaka attacking Shipon during training, he displays extraordinary piloting abilities beyond what his ship should have been capable of handling. Another example would be during a simulator-game where Rinna scored Rank A, and Shima scored Rank B, but he scored Rank S. When Shima asks why Kouta does not do the best during class, especially since he is capable of it, he merely says: he wonders why also. Pierre once remarks "Talented hawks hide their talons" when referring to Kouta's skills.

On a different note, James was curious of Kouta's 'vision' and said he was chosen by the universe.

 

 Arisa is Shipon's best friend at the Stellvia foundation. They meet on the shuttle going to the station from Earth at the beginning of the term, and find themselves rooming together and in the same class as well. Though Arisa is nowhere near Shipon in academic or piloting ability, she finds Shipon to be an inspiration to improve herself, and calls Shipon her "Star of Hope". Later in the series, she begins focusing on becoming a mechanic, rather than a pilot.

 

 Rinna is a transfer student from the Ultima foundation, and considers Shipon to be both a friend and chief rival. Rinna is a few years younger than Shipon and most of the other students, but because there are few children at Ultima (it being the newest of the foundations, and still incomplete), she has little to do with herself but play with simulators. As a result, she's far better at piloting and zero-G movement than most people years older than she is.

 

 Yayoi is one of the older students in Shipon's class. Yayoi had been in Stellvia's training program 2 years before, but left after a flight training accident. Ayaka Machida attempted to save her, and failed, but it turned out the "accident" was intentionally caused by Ayaka in the first place.

 Recognizing the signs of another "accident" when Ayaka took Shipon out to train alone, she warns Kouta of what might be about to happen. Kouta is able to prevent another tragedy.

 Despite the attacks on herself and Shipon, Yayoi lies to protect Ayaka when it looked like she might face expulsion from Stellvia.

 

 Akira is a quiet and somewhat taciturn member of Shipon's class as well as Yayoi's roommate. Though she becomes irritated easily when around people too much, she learns to enjoy spending time with Yayoi, Shipon, Arisa and the others of their group. Late in the series, she starts dating JoJo.

 

 One of the "Big 4" of Stellvia, (older students who are at the top of their classes), Ayaka is shown as competitive in the extreme. She has something of an inferiority complex which drives her to be the absolute best, and she can't tolerate seeing others better than her.

 Two years in the past, when Yayoi was her classmate, she arranged an accident to ensure her own position at the top of the class. Things went a little out of hand, however, and it looked like Yayoi might lose her life, so Ayaka rescued her. Yayoi was hospitalized and traumatized, and left Stellvia for a time. Now with Shima Katase looking like she would surpass Ayaka as well, the same thing almost happened. Had Yayoi not returned to Stellvia and recognized the danger Shipon might be in, Ayaka might have seriously injured or even killed her. Due to Yayoi covering up the truth of the earlier incident, Ayaka was not expelled from Stellvia, but was suspended for a time.

 After Yayoi forgives Ayaka for nearly causing her to lose her life.

 

 Richard is the Head Teacher of Stellvia's Space Academy. He is also the one who conducted the entrance interview for Shima. He is avuncular and usually takes the optimistic view of events. Richard also encourages his peers to put more trust in the prep students when events put them in critical situations. Richard plays a lot of chess with Hutter.

 

 Hutter is a teacher at Stellvia's Space Academy. He appears unemotional and calm at all times. Usually, Hutter plays the Devil's Advocate against Richard James' optimism. He helps Shima with her confidence towards the end of the series. He is a sentient alien in origin later on in the series.

 

 Shirogane is another teacher at Stellvia's Space Academy; he appears to teach programming. He is particularly enthusiastic about the school's athletics carnival and Astroball, (a game that has some similarities with Lacrosse), which he played in his student days at Stellvia. Passionate and determined, Jinrai is intent upon having the students' voices heard when no-one will listen. Jinrai has feelings for the flirtatious school nurse Ren.

 

 Instructor in charge of Pilot Training at Stellvia. She used to be an elite pilot, and spent some time wallowing in despair after losing the "elite" tag. However, she recovers from this (after an incident on a space station that was under construction) and chooses to become an instructor at Stellvia. She is tough toward the students because she wants them to succeed, she has a loving smile toward the childlike attributes of her students and is very scary when she is mad.

 Ren Renge

 A nurse at Stellvia. Ren is very flirtatious and early on in the series dates different men, which causes Jinrai to become jealous. She also works closely with the pilots, especially Kouta, who she assists with training for missions. She seems to also have feelings for Jinrai.

 

 Another of Shipon's classmates, Jojo (as he is called) is loud and enthusiastic. He is not very good in his studies nor pilot training and sometimes get needled because of it. Nevertheless, he is not all bad apples, he eventually starts dating Akira later on in the series. He sometimes has some rather good things to say that are very influential, he tries to cheer Akira up one time when she is depressed at the gap between her and the top students.

 Pierre Takida

 Another of Shipon's classmates, Pierre is good looking and a big talker, but doesn't seem to have a lot more than that going for him. He likes to hit on virtually every girl he lays eyes on, even Rinna in one episode. He shows particular interest in Yayoi, but Yayoi is adamant in refusing him.

 

 Another of Shipon's classmates, he is seen hanging out with Joey and Pierre. Others call him by his nickname, Dai, which is another reading for his given name in kanji (大). In the last few episodes he becomes very serious and says some very influential things which is broadcast through the solar system as the last sounds from Stellvia before the inevitable end.

 

 One of the Big 4. She usually quotes something of Shakespeare (sometimes attributing the quote to the wrong play) or the Bible. Nothing much else is known about her.

 Kent Austin

 One of the Big 4. He usually tries to stir Ayaka up with information that could be potential competition for her with no intention of any of it leading to the "accidents" arranged by Ayaka. He gets Shipon and her friends out of a spot of trouble at the beginning when he saw them as he was passing by. Kent seems to like Ayaka more than just a friend. Though he doesn't try to make anything out of it.

 Ritsuo Shoujin

 One of the Big 4. Devoted to training, he is described as being a "Ninja" by Shipon. Shoujin is very quiet and reserved, rarely speaking. He merely nods and "hmm"'s when in agreement.

Stellvia 2

The storyline for Stellvia was originally intended to run for at least 3 half-seasons, with the 3rd half-season focusing on Kouta. However, Stellvia director Tatsuo Sato stated on his website in 2005 that plans for the Stellvia sequel are now impossible due to "inner difficulties".

"08/10/2005 (WED) Sorry for contradicting what I remarked yesterday.

Many people gave me e-mails and phone calls after I posted my comment yesterday. They say that "Certainly the project was derailed, but it does never always mean the project will disappear for good." I appreciate your remarks. Well, I was a little bit exaggerating. So, I'd like to modify the comment as follows.

The continuation of Uchuu no Stellvia had become impossible.* All the pre-planning for an Uchuu no Stellvia 2 came to a halt. The same applied to Kidou Senkan Nadesico.

Thank you very much for all your trouble. I have no idea about the future of Stellvia now, but if something will be officially determined, I will announce it here.

Best wishes, "

(*) The word is not 無理 (muri, "unfeasible"), which is normally used to indicate a situation that is locked, but possibly solvable, but 不可能 (fukanou, "impossible") - it's a much more definite term.

(Information provided by the Anime News Network and translation by babel fish, Shu and ANN forum members)

Media

Anime

Manga

Video games

Two video games have been released based on the anime series, both named "Uchuu no Stellvia". The PlayStation 2 game was released on the 22 January 2004. The Game Boy Advance game was released on the 23 April 2004. Both games are adventure dating simulations though they do vary in gameplay.

In the PlayStation 2 game, the player assumes the role of a new student who has enrolled at the Stellvia Space Station Foundation. Each day he assigns various commands on what to do such as studying or resting in the same type of gameplay that Tokimeki Memorial has except for weekends since there is no school then. At the weekends he may invite a character on a date. There are various events to be seen in the game and there are 10 multiple endings. The game resembles the aforementioned Tokimeki Memorial game series in many ways (though in Tokimeki Memorial the player only assigns various commands for the coming week and not for each day).

The Game Boy Advance game is different from the PlayStation 2 game in terms of gameplay and plays a lot like the famous Sotsugyou series of games also known as Graduation in the west. The main difference in this game as opposed to the PlayStation 2 game is that the player assumes the role of a new teacher instead of a student in the PS2 game. He must teach the four main heroines (Ayaka and Rinna also come into the game later on as his students) various subjects so that they are prepared for the Great Mission. The game is like Graduation in that the player has to balance out the various girl's stats and must not neglect them since in this case, they start to skip classes and the game can end. Throughout the classes the player character must ask the girl's various questions on the corresponding subject. After a question a number of things can happen. A girl may put up her hand to answer the question, the player can also choose one of the girls to answer or can answer the question themselves. The player may also individually teach a specific girl on subjects. Various events can be seen with the various characters from the series at lunchtime or after school.

References

External links
Anime
Stellvia at King Records official website
Stellvia at TV Tokyo official website
Stellvia at Madman Entertainment official website

Manga
Stellvia at Dengeki Comics official website
Stellvia at DrMaster official website

2003 anime television series debuts
2003 manga
Adventure anime and manga
Anime with original screenplays
Bandai Namco franchises
Fiction set around Beta Hydri
Dengeki Comics
Dengeki Daioh
Discotek Media
Game Boy Advance games
Game Boy Advance-only games
Geneon USA
Japan-exclusive video games
Madman Entertainment anime
Mecha anime and manga
PlayStation 2 games
PlayStation 2-only games
Romance anime and manga
Shōnen manga
TV Tokyo original programming
Video games developed in Japan
Visual novels
Xebec (studio)